Bara-lacha la also known as Bara-lacha Pass, or Bārā Lācha La, (el. ) is a high mountain pass in the Zanskar range of Northern-India, connecting Lahaul district in Himachal Pradesh to Leh district in Ladakh. Rail-cum-road tunnels are being constructed under the Bara-lacha la, Lungalacha La (84 km north of Bara-lacha la) and Taglang La (171 km north of Bara-lacha la) to cater for the traffic on existing NH3 Leh–Manali Highway & under-construction Bhanupli–Leh line. 

The two headwaters of the Chenab River, Chandra and Bhaga, originate near the Baralacha Pass. The Bhaga river originates from Surya taal lake, which is situated a few of kilometers from the pass towards Manali. The Chandra originates from glacier in this region. The native name of Chenab, "Chandrabhaga", represents the union of Chandra and Bhaga rivers downstream.

The pass also acts as a water-divide between the Bhaga river and the Yunam river.

Legend
Folklore states that the two divine lovers, Chandra, daughter of the Moon god, and Bhaga, the son of the Sun god, decided to perform their eternal marriage atop the Bara-lacha-la. From there they ran in opposite directions.

Soon Bhaga was found coming with great struggle through the narrow gorges to Tandi, where consequently, they both met and the celestial marriage was performed. Bhaga covered about  distance, which was very difficult.

Geography
Cross roads from Spiti, Ladakh, Zanskar and Lahaul meet at the Baralacha Pass. In ancient times it was part of a trade route. On the northwest originates the Bhaga River while the Chandra flows south-east. Below the Baralacha-la is an emerald lake, the Suraj tal (Sun lake), the source of the river Bhaga.

"Mr. Shaw thus describes the region:
"The Bara Lacha is the boundary between two separate regions distinguished by their physical characteristics. That which we have already passed through may be called the true Himalayan region. Here the gigantic ranges are covered with perpetual snow, furrowed by glaciers, and they arise from amid dense forests which clothe their flanks up to a certain elevation. They are separated by deep gorges, whose sides are precipices, and though which large rivers flow. In fact the scenery is Alpine.
Henceforward, however, we must bear in mind  that we are in the barren or Tibetan region, where green spots are about as rare as islands in the ocean, and universal gravel is the rule."

In popular culture

In Rudyard Kipling's novel Kim, there is a reference to Bara-lacha la pass the source of the Suraj Tal having been used by Kim's Lama to enter India from Tibet.

Tourism and trekking

A trekking route leads from Bara-lacha la to Chandra Taal, situated by the bank of Chandra River in the Spiti Valley. In about a week's time, trekking in this region involves camping and walking at reasonably high altitude, and crossing a few glacial rivers. The basic day wise itinerary that trekkers can follow is:
 Manali (2000 m) - Batal (3907 m) drive
 Batal (3907 m) - Chandrataal (4300 m) hike
 Chandrataal (4300 m) - Tokpo Gongma (4320 m) hike
 Tokpo Gongma (4320 m) - Tokpo Yongma (4640 m) hike
 Tokpo Yongma (4640 m) - Baralacha La (4900 m) - Manali

Gallery

See also 

 Geography of Ladakh
 India-China Border Roads
 List of mountain passes of India

References

External links

Lahaul and Spiti - Baralacha Pass
Bara-lacha-la photos on Trek Earth
More Bara-lacha-la photos on Trek Earth
Moon lake trek - Over baralacha la
Batal Bara-lacha-la road and trekking map 

Mountain passes of Himachal Pradesh
Mountain passes of the Himalayas
Geography of Lahaul and Spiti district